The Barelang Bridge (Jawi:جمبتن باريلڠ ;) is a chain of 6 bridges of various types that connect the islands of Batam, Rempang, and Galang, Riau Islands built in 1997. Barelang also refers to the islands themselves, which are all administratively part of the municipality of Batam. 
The smaller islands of Tonton, Nipah, and Setotok (considered parts of the Batam island group) connect Batam and Rempang, while a further small island - Galang Baru - is connected at the southern end of the chain. The entire Barelang region covers 715 km².

Some locals call the bridge Jembatan Habibie after Jusuf Habibie, who oversaw the project in construction, aiming to transform the Rempang and Galang islands into industrial sites (resembling present-day Batam). The concept design for the 6 bridges were proposed by Bruce Ramsay of VSL. 
Habibie had requested that the designs should be based on a variation of different structural bridge types, in order to introduce & develop new bridge design & building technologies for the Indonesian market. 

Over time the bridge sites have grown more into a tourist attraction rather than just a transportation route.

The full stretch of all 6 bridges total to 2 kilometers. Travelling from the first bridge to the last is about 50 km and takes about 50 minutes. Construction of the bridges started in 1992 and took names from fifteenth to eighteenth-century rulers of the Riau Sultanate.

Bridges

Tengku Fisabilillah Bridge, connects Batam and Tonton island. It stretches for 642 meters and is the most popular bridge of all, being a cable-stayed bridge with two 118 m high pylons and main span 350 m.
Nara Singa Bridge, a cantilever bridge with total length 420 m and main span 160 m, connects Tonton island with Nipah island.
Ali Haji Bridge, a girder bridge with total length 270 m and main span 45 m, connects Nipah island with Setoko island.
Sultan Zainal Abidin Bridge, a cantilever bridge with total length 365 m and main span 145 m, connects Setoko island with Rempang island.
Tuanku Tambusai Bridge, an arch bridge with total length 385 m and main span 245 m, connects Rempang island with Galang island The road deck was constructed using the incremental launching method, whereby the deck was constructed on the bridge approach and then launched horizontally by the use of hydraulic jacks with special sliding bearings out over the previously constructed arch.
Raja Kecik Bridge, the smallest bridge with a total length of 180m, connects Galang island with Galang Baru island.

References

External links 

 Your best Batam Island Info guide

Bridges completed in 1997
Bridges in Indonesia
Cable-stayed bridges in Indonesia
Arch bridges
Cantilever bridges
Road bridges
Concrete bridges
Buildings and structures in the Riau Islands
Transport in the Riau Islands